Loren Long (born 1964) is an American author of children's books best known for illustration. He won the Society of Children's Book Writers and Illustrators' (SCBWI) Golden Kite Award for picture book illustration in 2004 for I Dream of Trains by Angela Johnson.

Biography
Long was born in Joplin, Missouri.  He graduated from University of Kentucky, with a BA in Graphic Design. He lives in Cincinnati, Ohio with his wife and two sons.

His career began at Gibson Greeting Cards in Cincinnati, Ohio eventually moving on to freelance illustration which gave him national exposure for children's books illustrations. A Simon & Schuster executive saw his work for Miles’ Song by Alice McGill and tapped him for the illustrations for I Dream of Trains by Angela Johnson. In 2004, I Dream of Trains won the Golden Kite Award for Picture Book Illustration. In 2005, he was a Golden Kite Award Honoree for his illustrations in When I Heard the Learn’d Astronomer by Walt Whitman. In 2010, he illustrated Of Thee I Sing: A Letter to My Daughters by Barack Obama.

When he was 12 years old, he learned that he was colorblind. In his work, he relies on strong lighting sources, color theory, and support from his family to overcome this obstacle.

Selected works

References

External links

 
 Interview by Lori Tracy at Mackin.com (login required)
 
 

1964 births
American children's book illustrators
University of Kentucky alumni
Living people
Date of birth missing (living people)